Mary Stuart Harrison Smith (February 10, 1834 – December 8, 1917) was an American author, translator, and women's advocate. Her Virginia Cookery Book (1885) is one of the country's early modern cookbooks. In addition to other original works, she published over fifty translated compositions, primarily from the German to English. She was a descendant of the Harrison family of Virginia, and also authored numerous book reviews for various periodicals.

In 1893, Smith attended and spoke on behalf of Virginia women at the Chicago World's Congress, which was designed to highlight women's rights. In 1895 she was among the women invited by the Virginia governor to represent the commonwealth's female workers at the Board of Women's convention at the International Exposition in Atlanta.

Smith is prominently memorialized at the University of Virginia chapel—she was likely a participant in the funding and creation of the chapel as a resident of the campus at the time.

Early life and family

Smith was born at the University of Virginia, in Charlottesville, on February 10, 1834. She was the second child of Professor Gessner Harrison and wife Eliza Lewis Carter Tucker. Professor Harrison was the son of Dr. Peachy Harrison and Mary (née Stuart). Dr. Harrison was a physician and politician in Harrisonburg, which was founded by his grandfather, Daniel Harrison. Eliza Tucker was the daughter of Prof. George Tucker and Maria Ball Carter.

Smith’s education was provided by family and private tutors—her grandfather and father taught philosophy and ancient languages, respectively. She studied Latin, German, French, Italian, and Greek, and she demonstrated a proclivity for poetry beginning at age 13.

On July 31, 1853, she married Francis H. Smith (1829–1928), son of Daniel Grove Smith and Eleanor Buckey. He was a Professor and Faculty Chairman at the university and they made their 69-year residence on the Lawn in Pavilion V there.

The Smiths had eight children in addition to four who died in infancy:
 Eliza Lewis Carter—died 1880; married William W. Walker
 Eleanor Annabel—married 1st, Fielding Miles, married 2nd, Dr. Charles W. Kent 
 Lelia Maria—portraitist; married Lucien Cocke
 Gessner Harrison—1861–1892
 George Tucker, M.D.—Rear Admiral, U.S.N; died 1939
 Mary Stuart—died 1900
 Eleanor Rosalie—1870–1956; married Isaac Carrington Harrison, M.D.
 James Duncan—1879–1934; portraitist

Career

Original works 
After the American Civil War, Smith's nascent interest in writing began to flourish with her Art of Housekeeping in 1878, which first appeared as a series of papers written for the New York Fashion Bazar. Her first original book Heirs of the Kingdom was published in Nashville in 1880, for which a prize of $300 was awarded by a select committee. 

Smith's Virginia Cookery Book was one of the early modern efforts made of that genre in America, in 1885. In the preface, Smith provided her principal motivation for the book, as one of “expediency” in light of “old domestic institutions being done away with.” She then gave reverence to her forebears in cookery, saying, “Enough it will be for the Virginia Cookery Book to take its place on the housekeeper’s pantry-shelf alongside the similar works of Miss Leslie, Marion Harland, Mrs. Henderson, and Mrs. Hale.” Smith further emphasized the role of her book as “a memento of the past, as well as a help in the present,” extolling Mary Randolph‘s Virginia Housewife (1824), of which there was then no authorized edition extant. Smith then reproduced the introduction to Randolph's book, which was written for that lady by Smith's grandfather, Professor Tucker.

Smith's Lang Syne, or the Wards of Mt. Vernon was published on the occasion of the Washington Centennial, held in New York in April 1887.   Her series of  Letters from a Lady in New York was published (date unknown) in the Religious Herald.

Translations

Critics thought Smith had a special gift for translating German poetry, including her Chidhe in the Overland Monthly. She authored many translations for leading periodicals and publishing houses. From Ernst Werner, she translated A Hero of the Pen, Hermann, Good Luck, What the Spring Brought, St. Michael, A Judgment of God, and Beacon Lights. Her translations from other German writers were Lieschen,  The Fairy of the Alps, The Bailiff's Maid, Gold Elsie, Old Ma'amselle's Secret, The Owl House, The Lady With the Rubies, Serapis, The Bride of the Nile, and Lace by Paul Lindau, and others. She also translated from the French, The Salon of Mine and Necker.

Her work includes books for children, also translations from the German, such as The Canary Bird and Other Stories and Jack the Breton Boy. Other children's works were adaptations from the French, including How Lillie Spent Her Day and Little May and Her Lost A.

Review articles
Some of Smith's articles were in the form of reviews for the Southern Review, the Southern Methodist Quarterly, and the Church Review. Among her best review articles were Askaros Kassis Karis, Robert Emmet, Queen Louisa of Prussia, John of Barneveldt, What the Swallows Sang, The Women of the Revolution, The Women of the Southern Confederacy, Madame de Stael and Her Parents, The Necker Family, Madam Recamier, Mary and Martha Washington, and The Virginia Gentlewoman of the Olden Time.

Smith also made numerous contributions of practical articles in Harper's Bazar, as well as others in the American Agriculturist, Good Housekeeping, and other periodicals.

Advocacy for women

Smith attended the Congress of Representative Women held at the Chicago World's Fair in 1893. The Congress focused on the political, social, and technical agendas of women, including suffrage, and was attended by activists including Jane Addams, Bertha Palmer, Lucy Stone, and Susan B. Anthony. Smith spoke on "The Virginia Woman of Today" and included an anecdote reflecting the admitted, but officially unacknowledged, ability of Virginia women in the fine arts:

Smith in her speech also reviewed the remarkable efforts of Dr. Orianna Moon as an example of indomitable feminine spirit—Dr. Moon of Scottsville, Virginia, became a pioneer for women seeking a career as a medical doctor. Smith concluded her remarks as follows: 
The World’s Fair ended abruptly with the tragic assassination of Chicago's Mayor, and Smith's distant cousin, Carter Harrison, Sr.

In 1895 Smith was in a group commissioned by Virginia Governor Charles T. O’Ferrall to represent the Virginia Dept. of Women Workers at the Board of Women of the Cotton States International Exposition in Atlanta. The Virginia legislature was not then in session and, there being no funds available for the journey and stay in Atlanta, the women's group resolved to raise the funds by individually creating patriotic song lyrics for compilation and sale. Smith therefore served as editor in producing From Virginia to Georgia, A Tribute in Song by Virginia Women, that included three entries of her own, one of which, The Ideal Wife, is at margin.

University of Virginia memorial
The University of Virginia Christian community remembers Smith positively. Smith's connection with the chapel is not otherwise documented. Record of the original funding and construction of the chapel, which coincide with Smith's lifelong campus residency, indicates the formation in 1883 of the Ladies Chapel Aid Society, prior to the laying of the chapel's cornerstone in 1885 and completion in 1889. The chapel's exhibit at the university's library indicates, "A chapel was finally built on the grounds in the 1880s after a successful campaign led by women dedicated to the spiritual needs of the University community." Library records further show total funds raised were about $36,000.

Smith is interred in the university cemetery with her husband.

Gallery–University of Virginia Chapel and Cemetery

Works

Notes

References

Works cited

Attribution

1834 births
1917 deaths
19th-century American writers
20th-century American writers
19th-century American women writers
Women cookbook writers
20th-century American women writers
19th-century American translators
Writers from Charlottesville, Virginia
Harrison family of Virginia
Burials at the University of Virginia Cemetery